Régis Manon (22 October 1965 – 1 January 2018) was a Gabonese professional football player and coach.

Career
Born in Libreville, Manon played club football for FC 105 Libreville, Tours B, Tours and Joué-lès-Tours.

He also played for the Gabonese national team, and was a squad member at the 1994 Africa Cup of Nations.

He later became a coach, for teams including Mounana and Akanda.

References

1965 births
2018 deaths
Gabonese footballers
Gabon international footballers
FC 105 Libreville players
Tours FC players
US Joué-lès-Tours players
Championnat National players
Ligue 1 players
Ligue 2 players
Association football forwards
Gabonese expatriate footballers
Gabonese expatriate sportspeople in France
Expatriate footballers in France
1994 African Cup of Nations players
1996 African Cup of Nations players
Gabonese football managers
21st-century Gabonese people
Sportspeople from Libreville